Subei may refer to:

 Subei region or Northern Jiangsu, the part of Jiangsu north of the Yangtze
Subei people, those who from North Jiangsu 
 Subei Mongol Autonomous County, Jiuquan, Gansu, China